A Great Life is a 1939 Soviet drama film directed by Leonid Lukov.

Plot 
A small mining village in the Donbas lives a working life. Three months ago, a new party organizer, Khadarov, came to the mine. With his arrival life revived both in the village and at the mine. Work is underway to re-equip the mine. The Party organizer supports the initiative of the young engineer Petukhov, who, with the support of experienced miners, is developing a new method of coal mining. But not everyone believes in the success of the new method. More than others, the chairman of the mine committee Usynin expresses his doubts, a man who is afraid of any responsibility and always tries to stay on the sidelines. He is still trying to stop innovation at the mine, fearing responsibility for possible failures. In any case, the adopted son assures others that the method developed by Petukhov is doomed to failure. Unable to withstand the humiliation and insults, Petukhov is going to leave the mine. But mine veterans Kuzma Kozodoev and Viktor Bugorkov believe in the success of the new method and persuade Petukhov to stay at the mine and continue the work begun. Khadarov supports them in this. When the chief engineer Ivanov fell ill, Khadarov insisted that Petukhov be entrusted with the duties. The confidence of the management made the young engineer with renewed vigor finish the work on the introduction of a new method of coal mining.

Cast
 Ivan Pelttser as Kozodoev 
 Ivan Novoseltsev as Khadarov 
 Stepan Kayukov as Usynin  
 Yuri Lavrov as Kuzmin 
 Mark Bernes as Petukhov  
 Vera Shershnyova as Sonya Osipova 
 Boris Andreyev as Khariton Balun  
 Pyotr Aleynikov as Vanya Kurskiy  
 Lidiya Kartashyova as Kozodoev's wife 
 Lavrenti Masokha as Makar Lyagotin

References

External links 

1939 films
1930s Russian-language films
Soviet drama films
1939 drama films
Soviet black-and-white films
Dovzhenko Film Studios films
Films about mining
Films based on Russian novels